Stupid refers to stupidity, a lack of intelligence.

Stupid may also refer to:
Stupid (art movement), a group of artists in Cologne, Germany, in the 1920s
Stupid!, a UK children's television show on CBBC
Stupid.com, a web site

Songs
"Stupid" (Ashnikko song), 2019
"Stupid" (Sarah McLachlan song), 2004
"Stupid", by Aitana from Tráiler, 2018
"Stupid", by Brockhampton from Saturation III, 2017
"Stupid", by G Flip from About Us, 2019
"Stupid", by the Game from Drillmatic – Heart vs. Mind, 2022
"Stupid", by Hyoyeon from Deep, 2022
"Stupid", by Per Gessle from The World According to Gessle, 1997
"Stupid", by Playaz Circle from Flight 360: The Takeoff, 2009
"Stupid", by Raven-Symoné from Raven-Symoné, 2008
"Stupid", by Tate McRae from All the Things I Never Said, 2020

See also
"Stupid Stupid", a single by English musician Alex Day
The Stupids, a fictional family in a series of books by Harry Allard and James Marshall
The Stupids (film), a 1996 comedy/adventure film based on the family
The Stupids (band), a hardcore punk band
Stoopid (disambiguation)